Dr. John Jennings (fl. 18th-century) was an Irish physician.

Jennings was a member of the Mac Jonin family of Ironpool, Kilconly, Tuam, and a cousin of Charles Edward Jennings de Kilmaine. He died young from a fever he contracted while attending a patient in the neighbourhood of Tuam. His death occasioned a lament titled Doctúir Jennings, composed by Patrick Greaney.

Extracts from the lament
A Dhochtúir Jennings, céad fároir cráidhte! Is tú fuair bás uainn i dtús do shaoghail: Dá siubhalainn Connacht agus Oileán Phádraic Samhail mo mhaighistir ní bhfuighinn i dtír

Nuair a bhreathnuighim síos ar Pholl an Iarrain, Cé an cás dom bliadhain acht arís go deó, Ins an áit a h'oileadh an leannaibh uasal. Acht nach truaigh sin a's mo chreach, é'r lár!

See also
 Soraca Jonin

References
 Irish Swordsmen of France, pp. 294–296 Richard Hayes, Dublin, 1934.

People from County Galway
18th-century Irish medical doctors
Year of death unknown
Year of birth unknown